Boisvert is a surname. Notable people with the surname include:

 Laurier J. Boisvert, former President of the Canadian Space Agency
 Michael Boisvert (born 1973), Canadian actor and choreographer
 Serge Boisvert (born 1959), Canadian ice hockey player

See also
 Montréal/Boisvert & Fils Water Airport, Canadian water aerodrome in Montreal, Quebec
 Boisvert River (Normandin River)